Wishart Bryan Bell (born in Canada, currently living in South Bend, Indiana) is an American choral conductor, pianist, music educator, and musicologist.  In 1997, he joined the faculty at Bethel College, Mishawaka, Indiana. He retired in 2016.

Founder of Musical Arts Indiana 
Bell founded Vesper Chorale in 1993, Vesper Chamber Orchestra in 1999, and the Children's Choir of Michiana in 2004.  In 2010 Vesper Chorale Inc. re-organized as Musical Arts Indiana Inc., creating a new parent organization. Based in South Bend, Musical Arts Indiana sponsors  Vesper Chorale, Vesper Chamber Orchestra, Consortia, and the Children's Choir of Michiana.  Bell served as artistic director of the organization and conductor from its inception until his retirement. He conducted his final concerts in May 2018.

Selected discography 
 ''How excellent is Thy name," Fantasy Sound, Kitchener, Ontario (1977) 
 Emmanuel Chorale; Kenneth Smith, piano; Roger Charman, guitar; Wishart Bell, conductor
 "How Can I Keep From Singing?",  recording of hymns commissioned by Fine Arts Radio Station WAUS and the Howard Performing Arts Center, Andrews University September, 2007
 "Lo How a Rose" traditional and modern carols for Christmas,  2001, with Vesper Chorale.  Includes settings by Britten, Jacques, Willcocks and others
"The Light of the World," unaccompanied sacred choral works, summer 2000. Includes works by Distler, Duruflé, Poulenc, Rains, Shaw/Parker
 "Holocaust Cantata: Songs from the Camps," DVD recorded and broadcast by Public Television Station WNIT, 2010

Selected publications 
 Mozart’s Requiem: A Guide to Performing Musicians, published in the Journal of the Conductors’ Guild, 2007
 What is a Church Choir? Article on philosophy of church choral singing, published in The American Organist, the journal of the American Guild of Organists, November 2006
 Faith as Expressed Through the Arts.  Essay calling the modern church to understand the vital role arts can play in worship, published in The American Organist, January 2007

External links 
 Wishart Bell official website
 Musical Arts Indiana official website
 Bell's biography at the Bethel College website
 http://southbendtribune.com/archives

Education 
 Trinity College, Deerfield, Illinois, 1971
 Master of Music, American Conservatory of Music, Chicago, 1974
 Doctor of Musical Arts, American Conservatory of Music, Chicago, 1997

References 

1948 births
American choral conductors
American male conductors (music)
Living people
21st-century American conductors (music)
21st-century American male musicians